Ángel Eduardo Mateo López (September 19→, 1940 – May 16, 1990) was a Uruguayan singer, songwriter, guitarist, and arranger. He played an important role in the development of modern Uruguayan music that combines beat, jazz, bossa nova and local rhythms like candombe in a way similar to Brazilian Tropicalismo. Academy Award-winner Jorge Drexler cited Mateo as a big influence.

His songs have been performed by  Pedro Aznar, Martin Buscaglia, Hugo Fattoruso, Leon Gieco, Mio Matsuda, Sandra Mihanovich, Milton Nascimento, Jaime Roos, and Yahiro Tomohiro.

Discography
 Mateo solo bien se lame (De la planta Argentina, 1972)
 Mateo solo bien se lame (De la planta, 1972)
 Cuerpo y alma (Sondor, cassette and vinyl, 1984)
 La Maquina del Tiempo presenta a: Mateo / Mal tiempo sobre Alchemia (1er. viaje) (Ayui/Tacuabe a/e69k. 1987)
 La Maquina del Tiempo / La mosca (Orfeo, 1989)
 La Máquina del Tiempo / 3er. viaje, 1ª parte: Ida (1971 – 1984)  (Ayuí/Tacuabé ae133cd, 1995)
 La Máquina del Tiempo / 3er. viaje, 2ª parte: Vuelta (1983 – 1988) (Ayuí/Tacuabé ae134cd, 1995)
 El Tartamudo (2000)

References

1940 births
1990 deaths
20th-century Uruguayan male singers
Uruguayan percussionists
Uruguayan male musicians
Uruguayan singer-songwriters
Male singer-songwriters
Musicians from Montevideo
Deaths from cancer in Uruguay
Burials at the Cementerio del Norte, Montevideo